Edmund Turner (29 January 1792 – December 1848) was an English Liberal Party politician.

He was elected at the 1837 general election as Member of Parliament (MP) for Truro in Cornwall, and held the seat until his death in 1849, aged 56.

References

External links
 

1792 births
1848 deaths
Liberal Party (UK) MPs for English constituencies
Members of the Parliament of the United Kingdom for Truro
UK MPs 1837–1841
UK MPs 1841–1847
UK MPs 1847–1852